The 2013 season was Viking's first full season with Kjell Jonevret as manager. They finished 5th in the Tippeligaen and were knocked out of the cup by Adeccoligaen side Bryne in the Third Round.

Squad

On Loan

Transfers

Winter

In:
 

 

Out:

Summer

In:

Out:

Competitions

Tippeligaen

Table

Results summary

Results by round

Matches

Norwegian Cup

Squad statistics

Appearances and goals

|-
|colspan="14"|Players away from Viking on loan:
|-
|colspan="14"|Players who left Viking during the season:

|}

Goal scorers

Disciplinary record

Notes

References

Viking FK seasons
Viking